Audacity means boldness.

Audacity may also refer to:

Computing 

 Audacity (audio editor), an audio editing application

Music 
 Audacity (album), a 2009 album by Ugly Duckling
 Audacity (band), an American garage rock band
 "Audacity" (song), by Stormzy, 2019
 Audacity, a 2012 jazz album by George Garzone and Frank Tiberi with Rasmus Ehlers, Jakob Høyer, Jonas Westergaard

Literary 
 Audacity, a 1924 novel by Ben Ames Williams
 Audacity, a 2017 book by Jonathan Chait

Military
 HMS Audacity (D10), a British naval vessel
 MV Audacity, a British merchant vessel renamed from Empire Audrey

See also 
 Audacious (disambiguation)
 Audacy, formerly Radio.com, a broadcast and internet radio platform